Nadim Karim Mohaisen Al-Magsoosi commonly known as Nadim Karim (born 1 January 1989) is an Iraqi footballer who plays for Al-Minaa in the Iraqi Premier League.

Info
A midfielder that blossomed at Al-Naft during the Iraq Super League 2007-08 season after his move from Al-Sinaa. He was signed on the absence of Mohammed Al-Sheikhli, one of his former coaches at Al-Sinaa. The midfielder grabbed his first team opportunities at Al-Naft with both hands and managed to break into the Iraq U-20 team under Kadhim Al-Rubaie. On 18 September 2013, he signed a contract with Saham SC of Omantel Professional League but just after games the club management decided to terminate his contract. In February 2013, Nadim again came to Oman and signed a contract with Al-Suwaiq Club of Oman.

Club career statistics

Honours

Country
2013 World Men's Military Cup: Champions

References

External links

Player Info at Goalzz.com

1989 births
Living people
Iraqi footballers
Iraq international footballers
Iraqi expatriate footballers
Association football midfielders
Duhok SC players
Al-Quwa Al-Jawiya players
Saham SC players
Suwaiq Club players
Expatriate footballers in Oman
Iraqi expatriate sportspeople in Oman
Al-Shorta SC players
Al-Mina'a SC players